The Whyte Review was a review into the practices of British Gymnastics. The review was co-commissioned by UK Sport and Sport England and led by Anne Whyte QC. It began in August 2020. The review received in excess of 400 submissions of evidence and £3 million. 190 interviews were conducted for the report and 133 former and current gymnasts were interviewed. It was published in June 2022.

The report detailed 'systemic' accounts of both physical and emotional abuse of young athletes. The submissions described  sexual assault, excessive weigh management and emotional abuse of gymnasts.

See also
USA Gymnastics sex abuse scandal

References

Gymnastics in the United Kingdom
2020 in British sport
Sports scandals in the United Kingdom